La Coucourde is a commune in the Drôme department in southeastern France. It housed the Horus community until 1997.

Population

See also
Communes of the Drôme department

References

Communes of Drôme